Buchlovice is a market town in Uherské Hradiště District in the Zlín Region of the Czech Republic. It has about 2,400 inhabitants.

Geography
It lies on the border between the Chřiby highlands and Kyjov Hills.

The streams Dlouhá řeka and Buchlovický flows through the municipality. Dlouhá řeka supplies the Sovín Reservoir, located south of the built-up area.

History
The first written mention of Buchlovice is from 1207 in a deed of Ottokar I of Bohemia. The Buchlov castle was first mentioned in 1300. In 1540, Buchlov was bought by the Lords of Zierotin and joined to the Buchlov estate. In 1805, the village was promoted by Emperor Francis II to a market town.

Sights
Buchlovice is known for the baroque Buchlovice Castle in the centre of Buchlovice, and for the Buchlov Castle on the eponymous hill above the market town.

Notable people
Friedrich von Berchtold (1781–1876), Austrian botanist; died here
Jiří Hanák (1938–2020), journalist, editor, Charter 77 signatory

References

External links

Populated places in Uherské Hradiště District
Market towns in the Czech Republic